Rodolfo Chiari Robles (November 15, 1869 in Aguadulce – August 16, 1937 in Monrovia, California) was a Panamanian politician of  the National Liberal Party.

Chiari was the general manager of National Bank of Panama from 1909 to 1914. He was elected as the third presidential designate by the National Assembly for the term 1910–1912, and as the first presidential designate for the term 1912–1914, and as the first presidential designate for the term 1922–1924.

Later he was elected as President of Panama from 1 October 1924 to 1 October 1928.

His son, Roberto Francisco Chiari, a Liberal like his father, was President of Panama from 1960 to 1964.

References

1869 births
1937 deaths
People from Aguadulce District
Panamanian people of Italian descent
National Liberal Party (Panama) politicians
Presidents of Panama
Vice presidents of Panama
Panamanian bankers